Sejil, or Sejjil, (a Quranic word meaning "baked clay", see Surat al-Fil) is a family of Iranian solid-fueled medium range ballistic missiles. The Sejil are replacements for the Shahab liquid-fueled ballistic missiles. According to US Pentagon sources, the missile profile of the Sejil closely matches those of the Ashura, Ghadr-110 and the Samen. The Sejil-2 was seen in the Great Prophet 15 war games conducted by Iran on the 15th of January, 2021.

Design 
According to Jane's Information Group, details of the design other than the number of stages and that it uses solid fuel have not been released. Uzi Rubin, former director of Israel's Ballistic Missile Defense Organization, indicated that, "Unlike other Iranian missiles, the Sajil bears no resemblance to any North Korean, Russian, Chinese or Pakistani (missile technology). It demonstrates a significant leap in Iran's missile capabilities." Rubin went on to state that the Sejil-1 " ... places Iran in the realm of multiple-stage missiles, which means that they are on the way to having intercontinental ballistic missile (ICBM) capabilities ..."

The missile utilizes composite solid fuel and unlike the Shahab-3 medium-range ballistic missile (MRBM), which is launched only vertically, the Sejil could be launched at a variable angle. As a weapon, Sejil presents much more challenge to Iran's potential enemies, as solid-fuel missiles can be launched with much less notice than liquid-fueled missiles, making them more difficult to strike prior to launch.

Political commentator Kiyan Nader Mokhtari elaborated more about the features of the new missile. "The engine and various fuels have been tested and the platform is now highly reliable. The latest tests to be carried out are mainly to do with the variety of warheads that it has to carry," he said.
"Some of the warheads obviously have been designed to be able to evade anti-ballistic missile defenses of the enemy in actual battle conditions," he added.

Iran claims that if launched from the city of Natanz, it could reach Tel Aviv in less than seven minutes.

Variants 

 Sejil-1: The Sejil is a two-stage, solid-propellant, surface-to-surface missile (SSM) produced by Iran with a reported  range.  A successful test launch took place on 13 November 2008. Its range, if confirmed, would allow it to strike targets as far away as Israel and southeastern Europe, though Iran asserts that it is intended for purely defensive purposes.
 Sejil-2: Sejil-2 is an upgraded version of the Sejil. The Sejil-2 two-stage solid-fuel missile has a 2,000 km range and was first test-fired on 20 May 2009. The Sejil-2 surface-to-surface medium-range ballistic missile (MRBM) was first tested eight months prior to the actual test launch, which took place in the central Iranian province of Semnan. Improvements include better navigation system, better targeting system, more payload, longer range, faster lift-off, longer storage time, quicker launch and lower detection possibility. On December 16, 2009,an upgraded version of Sejil-2 was test fired. 
 Sejil-3: An unconfirmed report stated the a Sejil-3 may be in development. The Sejil-3 would reportedly have three stages, a maximum range of 4,000 km, and a launch weight of 38,000 kg. The Sejil-3 is intended to be the first IRBM of the Sejil series.It is based on the design of the Sejil-2, but with an improved engine and guidance system and better survivability. The Sejil-3 is more maneuverable than its predecessor, making it harder for ABM systems to intercept. The final phase of testing is due to commence in early 2016, with entry into service by 2017.

See also 
 Military of Iran
 Iranian military industry
 List of military equipment manufactured in Iran
 Iran's missile forces
 Fateh-110
 Equipment of the Iranian Army
 Science and technology in Iran

External links 
CSIS Missile Threat - Sejjil

References 

Medium-range ballistic missiles of Iran
Intermediate-range ballistic missiles of Iran
Military equipment introduced in the 2010s